Arkys, also known as triangular spider or ambush spider, is a genus of Australian araneomorph spiders in the family Arkyidae, first described by Charles Athanase Walckenaer in 1837. They are often small, with a triangular shaped abdomen, and are found in Australia and some of its surrounding islands. They don't build webs, but can often be found on leaves and tips of flower heads. Their egg sacs are pinkish-orange and spherical, and are made late in the summer.

Species 
 it contains thirty-two species:
Arkys alatus Keyserling, 1890 — Australia (Queensland, New South Wales)
Arkys alticephala (Urquhart, 1891) — Southern Australia
Arkys brevipalpus Karsch, 1878 — New Caledonia
Arkys bulburinensis Heimer, 1984 — Australia (Queensland, New South Wales)
Arkys cicatricosus (Rainbow, 1920) — Australia (Lord Howe Is.)
Arkys cornutus L. Koch, 1872 — New Guinea, Australia (Queensland)
Arkys coronatus (Balogh, 1978) — New Guinea
Arkys curtulus (Simon, 1903) — Eastern Australia
Arkys dilatatus (Balogh, 1978) — Australia (Queensland)
Arkys enigma Douglas, 2019 — Australia (Tasmania)
Arkys furcatus (Balogh, 1978) — Australia (Queensland)
Arkys gracilis Heimer, 1984 — Australia (Queensland)
Arkys grandis (Balogh, 1978) — New Caledonia
Arkys hickmani Heimer, 1984 — Australia (Tasmania)
Arkys kaszabi (Balogh, 1978) — New Guinea
Arkys lancearius Walckenaer, 1837 — New Guinea to Australia (New South Wales)
Arkys latissimus (Balogh, 1982) — Australia (Queensland)
Arkys montanus (Balogh, 1978) — New Guinea
Arkys multituberculatus (Balogh, 1982) — Australia (Queensland)
Arkys nimdol Chrysanthus, 1971 — New Guinea
Arkys occidentalis (Reimoser, 1936) — Indonesia (Buru Is.)
Arkys roosdorpi (Chrysanthus, 1971) — New Guinea
Arkys semicirculatus (Balogh, 1982) — Australia (Queensland)
Arkys sibil (Chrysanthus, 1971) — New Guinea
Arkys soosi (Balogh, 1982) — New Guinea
Arkys speechleyi (Mascord, 1968) — Australia (New South Wales)
Arkys toxopeusi (Reimoser, 1936) — Indonesia (Buru Is.)
Arkys transversus (Balogh, 1978) — Australia (New South Wales)
Arkys tuberculatus (Balogh, 1978) — Australia (Queensland)
Arkys varians (Balogh, 1978) — New Caledonia
Arkys vicarius (Balogh, 1978) — New Caledonia
Arkys walckenaeri Simon, 1879 — Australia, Tasmania

References

Spiders of Australia
Arkyidae
Araneomorphae genera